Hyupsung High School is a high school in Nam District, Daegu, South Korea.

Clubs
Hyupsung high school includes these clubs below:
 AriRangTeukgondae(아리랑 특공대) (Alternative Artists Group, since 1999)
 A.I (Magic Club)
 Sensation (English Speech Club)
 Arirang 21(아리랑 21) (International Exchange Club)
 BM Crew (Beat Box Club)
 REPLAY (School band)
 E.O.S (Soccer Club)
 2M (Health Club)
 Daeduk(대덕) (Literature Club)
 Evangel (Christianity Music Club)
 Bedelcell(벧엘셀) (Catholic Club)
 GIGA (Computer Club)
 C.O.C (Astronomy Club)
 Mac(맥) (Book Club)
 UNESCO (Volunteer Club)
 CnP (Animation Club)
 HSBS (Broadcast Club)
 HAPO (Photograph Club)
 TRPG (Board Game Club)
 KINO (Movie Club)
 Antioch(안디옥) (Christianity Club)
 NEWTON (Science Club)
 EOD (Dance Club)

Symbols
School Motto: Carve your own way
School Flower: Korean Forsythia
School Tree: Himalayan Cedar

References

External links
  

High schools in South Korea
Education in Daegu
Educational institutions established in 1955
1955 establishments in South Korea
Boys' schools in South Korea